Elizabeth Despenser (died 10 April/11 April 1408) was an English noblewoman of the late 14th century.  She should not be confused with Elizabeth le Despenser, Baroness Berkeley, who was her great-aunt and who was the daughter of her great-grandmother, Eleanor de Clare. She was the daughter of Sir Edward le Despencer, 1st Baron le Despencer, by Lady Elizabeth Burghersh, daughter and heiress of Bartholomew de Burghersh, 2nd Baron Burghersh.

First marriage
She married Sir John FitzAlan, 2nd Baron Arundel. They had three sons and one daughter:
 John de Arundel, Lord Maltravers, and Lord Arundel.
 Thomas FitzAlan.
 Edward/Edmund Arundel.
 Margaret (married to William de Ros, 6th Baron de Ros)

Sir John de Arundel, 2nd Baron Arundel, died on 14 August 1390, and was buried at Missenden Abbey, Buckinghamshire.

Second marriage
Elizabeth married secondly, apparently after 28 April 1393 (as his second wife), William la Zouche, 3rd Baron Zouche of Haryngworth (d. 13 May 1396). They had no children. Her will requested burial at Tewkesbury Abbey, Gloucestershire.

Ancestry

References
 Ancestral Roots of Certain American Colonists Who Came to America Before 1700 by Frederick Lewis Weis, Lines: 21-32, 74-35, 212-34 

All pages needing cleanup
14th-century births
Year of birth unknown
1408 deaths
14th-century English people
15th-century English people
14th-century English women
15th-century English women
Arundel
Daughters of barons
Elizabeth
Elizabeth